François Denis de Rivoyre (1 May 1884 – 29 December 1946) was a French equestrian. He competed in two events at the 1928 Summer Olympics.

References

External links
 

1884 births
1946 deaths
French male equestrians
Olympic equestrians of France
Equestrians at the 1928 Summer Olympics
People from Vernon, Eure
Sportspeople from Eure